Campylobacter hyointestinalis is a species of Campylobacter implicated as a pathogen in gastroenteritis and diarrhoea in humans. It has been known to be transmitted from its usual host, the pig, to humans. In pigs, it is usually associated with proliferative ileitis, and found in conjunction with other species of that genus; however, it has also been isolated from hamster and cattle feces. It is catalase-positive, hydrogen sulfide-positive in the TSI slant, glycine-tolerant, and intolerant to 3.0% sodium chloride. It is able to grow at 25 °C, is sensitive to cephalothin, and resistant to nalidixic acid.

References

Further reading
Antimicrobial resistance:

External links
Type strain of Campylobacter hyointestinalis at BacDive -  the Bacterial Diversity Metadatabase

Campylobacterota
Bacteria described in 1983